Blue Star SC is a Sri Lankan professional football club based in Kalutara. The club competes in the Sri Lanka Champions League, the top flight of Sri Lankan football league system.

History
Blue Star SC was founded in 1978. On 5 April 2022, Blue Star appeared in the 2022 AFC Cup qualifying play-off match against Machhindra of Nepal, at the Dasharath Rangasala Stadium and clinched a victory of 2–1.

Achievements

Bristol League Division III
Champions: 1996–97
Champions: 1998–99
Sri Lankan Premier League: 2
Champions: 2004, 2021
Runners-up: 2007
Semi-finals: 2008
AFC President's Cup
Semi-finalist 3rd Place: 2005
Dialog Champion of Champions Trophy
Runners-up: 2003–04
Champions: 2004–2005
Runners-up: 2007
Quarter-finals: 2013
Cargills FA Cup
Runners-up: 2013
Runners-up: 2014
Semi-finals: 2015
Third place: 2018

External links
Blue Star SC page on www.the-afc.com
Blue Star SC Facebook Page

Players

Team management

Notable former players
Nafais
Fawzan
Farzeen
Rizvi
Jazeel
Rameez
Raheem
Mohammed Hamza

References

External links

Football clubs in Sri Lanka
Association football clubs established in 1978
1978 establishments in Sri Lanka